Panga Cliff (also Mustjala cliff) is a coastal cliff located on the northern shore of Saaremaa, at the end of the Kuressaare - Võhma road, close to Panga village. The entire cliff is approximately 2.5 km long.

Panga cliff consists of at least three terraces. Besides the main cliff, there is a smaller cliff located further inland, as well as an underwater cliff with height about  jutting a few hundred meters into the sea.

References 

Saaremaa Parish
Cliffs of Estonia
Saaremaa
Landforms of Saare County
Tourist attractions in Saare County
Baltic Klint